Excel Saga is an anime adaptation of the manga by Koshi Rikudo. The series was produced by J.C.Staff and directed by Shinichi Watanabe. It aired on TV Tokyo from October 7, 1999, to March 30, 2000 for 26 episodes. At the publisher's request, the anime series follows a different storyline from the manga; Rikdo was pleased with the adaptation. To balance the removal of Rikudou's original material, Watanabe added his own alter ego, Nabeshin, and expanded several elements, including increasing Pedro's role and expanding on the concept of the Great Will. The twenty-sixth episode, "Going Too Far", never aired in Excel Sagas original run on TV Tokyo because it was purposefully too violent and obscene for broadcast in Japan.

The series is licensed for an English-language release in North America and the United Kingdom by ADV Films, and in Australia and New Zealand by Madman Entertainment. The ADV Films English dub of the series was aired on the Anime Network in the United States, and on the Sci Fi Channel and Rapture TV in the United Kingdom. In North America, ADV released the series on six DVDs between June 11, 2002 and April 8, 2003. A complete collection of the series was released on July 6, 2004 as "Excel Saga - The Imperfect Collection" and re-released in different packaging on August 1, 2006 as "Excel Saga - Complete Collection". In the UK, the series was released between May 19, 2003 and March 15, 2004. The complete series was later released as "Excel Saga - Complete Box Set" on July 2, 2007,

The series uses two pieces of theme music by "Excel Girls". The opening theme, consists of the singers speculating on the nature of love. The closing theme,  consists of a series of barks from the canine character Menchi.


Episode list

Notes

References

Episodes
Excel Saga